Trypeta is a genus of tephritid,  or fruit flies in the family Tephritidae.

Species  
 Trypeta aberrans Hardy, 1973
 Trypeta albida Walker, 1853
 Trypeta amanda Hering, 1938
 Trypeta anitra Korneyev, 1997
 Trypeta apicalis (Shinji, 1939)
 Trypeta apicefasciata Hering, 1938
 Trypeta arcifera Hering, 1938
 Trypeta artemisiae (Fabricius, 1794)
 Trypeta basifasciata Richter & Kandybina, 1985
 Trypeta basilaris Wiedemann, 1830
 Trypeta beatifica Ito, 1984
 Trypeta bifasciata Han & Norrbom, 2005
 Trypeta binotata Zia, 1938
 Trypeta bipunctata Portschinsky, 1891
 Trypeta bomiensis Wang, 1996
 Trypeta brevivitta Walker, 1865
 Trypeta buddha Hering, 1942
 Trypeta californiensis Han & Norrbom, 2005
 Trypeta caucasia Bigot, 1880
 Trypeta chalybeiventris Wiedemann 1830
 Trypeta chiapasensis Han & Norrbom, 2005
 Trypeta choui Chen, 1948
 Trypeta concolor (Wulp, 1899)
 Trypeta costaricana Han & Norrbom, 2005
 Trypeta cyanogaster Wiedemann, 1830
 Trypeta cylindrica Walker, 1853
 Trypeta denticulata Han & Norrbom, 2005
 Trypeta digesta Ito, 1984
 Trypeta diversata Walker, 1865
 Trypeta divisa Walker, 1853
 Trypeta dorsocentralis Richter & Kandybina, 1985
 Trypeta excepta Walker, 1853
 Trypeta ferruginea Walker, 1853
 Trypeta flaveola Coquillett, 1899
 Trypeta flavifasciata Han & Norrbom, 2005
 Trypeta footei Han & Norrbom, 2005
 Trypeta fractura (Coquillett, 1902)
 Trypeta fujianica Wang, 1996
 Trypeta hostilis Hering, 1938
 Trypeta hysia Walker, 1849
 Trypeta immaculata (Macquart, 1835)
 Trypeta impleta Walker, 1859
 Trypeta inclinata Han & Norrbom, 2005
 Trypeta indica (Hendel, 1915)
 Trypeta intermissa Meigen, 1826
 Trypeta itoi Wang, 1996
 Trypeta laeta Walker, 1853
 Trypeta lineata Bezzi, 1913
 Trypeta longiseta Wang, 1996
 Trypeta luteonota Shiraki, 1933
 Trypeta maculata Han & Norrbom, 2005
 Trypeta maculosa (Coquillett, 1899)
 Trypeta mainlingensis Wang, 1996
 Trypeta melanoura Han & Norrbom, 2005
 Trypeta narytia Walker, 1849
 Trypeta novaeboracensis Fitch, 1855
 Trypeta oze Ito, 1984
 Trypeta pantherina Walker, 1853
 Trypeta parallela Walker, 1853
 Trypeta peltigrea Hering, 1938
 Trypeta pictiventris Chen, 1948
 Trypeta pseudozoe Hering, 1938
 Trypeta quadrangulifer Richter & Kandybina, 1985
 Trypeta quaesita Ito, 1984
 Trypeta quinquemaculata Wang, 1996
 Trypeta reducta Han & Norrbom, 2005
 Trypeta rufata (Wulp, 1899)
 Trypeta scutellata Walker, 1853
 Trypeta semipicta (Zia, 1939)
 Trypeta striata (Wulp, 1899)
 Trypeta submicans Zia, 1938
 Trypeta sumptuosa (Hering, 1938)
 Trypeta thoracalis Hendel, 1934
 Trypeta tortile Coquillett, 1894
 Trypeta tortilis Coquillett, 1894
 Trypeta trifasciata Shiraki, 1933
 Trypeta varia Walker, 1853
 Trypeta victrix Hering, 1938
 Trypeta wulpi Han & Norrbom, 2005
 Trypeta xingshana Wang, 1996
 Trypeta yushunica Wang, 1996
 Trypeta zayuensis Wang, 1996
 Trypeta zoe Meigen, 1826

The following are now synonyms:
 Trypeta actinobola: moved to Trupanea
 Trypeta acutangula: moved to Euarestoides
 Trypeta aesia: moved to Campiglossa
 Trypeta argyrocephala: moved to Campiglossa
 Trypeta avala: moved to Euxesta
 Trypeta biflexa: moved to Acinia
 Trypeta cincta: moved to Tephritis
 Trypeta cingulata: moved to Rhagoletis
 Trypeta fausta: moved to Rhagoletis
 Trypeta finalis: moved to Neotephritis
 Trypeta flexa: moved to Tritoxa
 Trypeta glauca: moved to Trupanea
 Trypeta grata: moved to Clinotaenia
 Trypeta guttatolimbata: moved to Platensina
 Trypeta indecora: moved to Asimoneura
 Trypeta longipennis: moved to Strauzia
 Trypeta lunifera: moved to Platomma
 Trypeta manto: moved to Rioxa
 Trypeta megacephala: moved to Euarestella
 Trypeta melanura: moved to Acidogona
 Trypeta misakiana: moved to Urophora
 Trypeta mixta: moved to Tephritis
 Trypeta multifasciata: moved to Oedaspis

References

Database
 Tephritid Workers Database

 
Trypetinae
Tephritidae genera